Ikramullah Gran Bacha (1941-2014), commonly known as Gran Baba, was a Pashto-language poet, ghazal writer and fiction writer from Pakistan. He died at the age of 73.

Books
He wrote the following three books:
Zama Ghazal (only book, published in the life of Ikram Ullah Gran) 
Jwand da khayal pa Aayeena ke (published after Gran's death) 
Spogmai (published after Gran's death)

References

Pashto-language writers
Pashto-language poets
1941 births
2014 deaths
Pashtun people
People from Charsadda District, Pakistan
Pakistani ghazal singers